This article lists events from the year 2016 in Bulgaria

Incumbents
 President: Rosen Plevneliev
 Prime Minister: Boyko Borisov

Events

5-21 August – Bulgaria at the 2016 Summer Olympics: 51 competitors in 14 sports. 
6 November – Bulgarian presidential election, 2016
6 November – a three-question referendum was held alongside presidential elections
10 December – the Hitrino train derailment, killing at least seven people

Deaths

13 February – Trifon Ivanov, footballer (b. 1965).

24 February – Yordan Sokolov, jurist and politician (b. 1933)
15 March – Lyubka Rondova, folk singer (b. 1936).

19 March – Pavel Chernev, politician and lawyer (b. 1969)
4 April – Georgi Hristakiev, footballer (b. 1944)
1 August – Trayan Dyankov, footballer (b. 1976)
8 August – Nikola Anastasov, actor (b. 1932)
6 November – Biser Kirov, pop singer (b. 1942)
10 November – Nikola Korabov, film director and screenwriter (b. 1928)
25 November – Alexander Yossifov, composer and conductor (b. 1940)
26 November – Velko Valkanov, politician (b. 1927)
3 December – Nikola Gigov, poet (b. 1937)
18 December – Guinio Ganev, politician (b. 1928)

References

Links

 
Years of the 21st century in Bulgaria
2010s in Bulgaria
Bulgaria 
Bulgaria